Issamar Ginzberg is a business strategy and marketing consultant. He is the founder and CEO of Monetized Intellect Consulting, a business and marketing firm with offices in New York City and Jerusalem. Ginzberg also founded English Speaking Entrepreneurs Israel (ESEI), an organization that assists English-speaking businessmen in adjusting to the Israeli business market.

Ginzberg, a rabbi, has conducted seminars on marketing in the U.S. and Israel.

He has a podcast on Yiddish24.com.

He has written for The Jerusalem Post, Hamodia, and The English Update. He has written several books, including How Marketers Mess With Your, Marketing Secrets that Are Used to Get Your Attention and How To Use Them To Your Advantage. Ginzberg wrote the foreword to Everything You Need to Know About Buying Real Estate in Israel by Shia Getter.

External links
Home page
Entrepreneur.com Bio

References 

Businesspeople from New Jersey
American Haredi rabbis
Israeli businesspeople
Living people
Year of birth missing (living people)
21st-century American Jews
American Ashkenazi Jews